Craig Cwm Amarch is not synonymous with Craig y Cau but names the headwall of Cwm Amarch on Cadair Idris in the Snowdonia National Park, in Gwynedd, north-west Wales.

There seems to be some confusion over naming by people who are not local. 'Craig Cwm Amarch' refers to the crags heading Cwm Amarch, which impinge from the south into the ridge of Mynydd Pencoed, a spur of the Cadair Idris range. The eastern end of Mynydd Pencoed overlooking Llyn Cau is known as Craig y Cau. (Daear Fawr, the ‘large ground’, may refer to an area of the Pencoed ridge. Mountain slopes in Wales are commonly named after the farms to whom the grazing belonged, hence Mynydd Pencoed is named after the farm (its buildings now derelict) at its western foot.

References

External links

Llanfihangel-y-Pennant
Mountains and hills of Gwynedd
Mountains and hills of Snowdonia
Hewitts of Wales
Nuttalls